The United Commercial Travellers' Association of Australia was an Australian tradesmen's association.

History
The association was formed in 1895. Its headquarters were established in Melbourne, in the facilities of the Commercial Travellers' Association of Victoria, which was formed in 1880. Affiliated organisations also existed in South Australia, which was the first to be established in 1866, followed by New South Wales (1883), Queensland (1884), Western Australia (1896) and Tasmania (1900). Its remit was aiding salesmen travelling across the country on train or carriage, providing increased protection from doubtful accommodation or business practices.

A brief note in the Brisbane Courier at the time of Incorporation in 1905 states the constitution was unanimously adopted by all associations at large public meetings.

"On July 11, 1907—that sounds almost in the dim ages—the very first paid-for telephone conversation on the newly opened Sydney-Melbourne trunk line was between the C.T.As. of New South Wales and Victoria, and it cost 6/- for three minutes.

Only the South Australian branch is still in operation.

Publications

Branches of the CTA produced a number of publications throughout its history, which were eventually amalgamated into a federal newspaper called The Australian Traveller. Other titles included:

 The Traveller
 Road and Sea
 The Commercial
 The Australasian Traveller
 Australia To-Day

International connections
 New Zealand
 Great Britain
 Canada
 South Africa

Significant buildings

 Melbourne - Commerce House, Flinders St, which now houses a hotel.
 Brisbane - Telecommunications House

Notable members and Office bearers

 the Association’s Patron, Mr. E. T. Smith, M.P., who was then Mayor of Adelaide.
 Mr James Davies

Closure

The organisation was wound up in 2014. Nic Price reported in the Melbourne Leader that the Victorian branch donated more than $500,000 to charities.

References

External links 
Digital archive held by the University of Melbourne
http://www.cta.org.au/

Professional associations based in Australia